The 2021 K League 1, also known as the Hana 1Q K League 1 for sponsorship reasons, was the 39th season of the top division of professional football in South Korea since its establishment in 1983 as the K League, and the fourth season under its current name, the K League 1. Jeonbuk Hyundai Motors successfully defended their title.

Due to the COVID-19 pandemic in South Korea, the number of games per team was made flexible in the 2021 season, and the number of games to be played was decided in February 2021. The 2021 season was divided into two parts. First, there were 33 Regular Rounds in which 12 teams played a round robin with 3 rounds (Rounds 1–33). Then there were a Final A and a Final B, each with 6 teams divided based on regular round performance, with each final being a round robin (Rounds 34–38).

Promotion and relegation
Teams relegated to the 2021 K League 2
 Sangju Sangmu→Gimcheon Sangmu (refounded and moved to Gimcheon as a military football team)
 Busan IPark

Teams promoted from the 2020 K League 2
 Jeju United
 Suwon FC (won the promotion play-off)

Impact of the COVID-19 pandemic 
On 4 May 2021, one footballer from FC Seoul tested positive to COVID-19; this caused postponements (in the 14th–17th rounds) to matches involving FC Seoul and Seongnam FC.

Participating clubs by province
The following twelve clubs competed in the K League 1 during the 2021 season.

Stadiums

Foreign players
Restricting the number of foreign players strictly to five per team, including a slot for a player from the Asian Football Confederation countries and a slot for a player from the Association of Southeast Asian Nations. A team could use five foreign players on the field each game, including at least one player from the AFC confederation. Samuel Pungi, who played for Pohang Steelers, was deemed to be a native player as he had been granted South Korean nationality.
The name in bold indicates that the player was registered during the mid-season transfer window.

League table

Positions by matchday

Round 1–33

Round 34–38

Fixtures and results

Matches 1–22 
Teams played each other twice, once at home, once away.

Matches 23–33 
Teams played each other once.

Final Round Matches 34–38 
Teams played each other once.
 

Final A

Final B

Relegation play-offs

The Promotion-relegation play-offs were contested between the winners of K League 2 play-offs and the 11th placed team in K League 1.

Gangwon FC won 4–2 on aggregate, to secure a place in the 2022 K League 1 season.

Season statistics

Top scorers

Top assists

Awards

Most Valuable Player of the Round

Monthly Awards

Season Awards 

The 2021 K League Awards was held on 7 December 2021.

K League Most Valuable Player

The K League Most Valuable Player award was won by  Hong Jeong-ho (Jeonbuk Hyundai Motors).

K League Young Player

The K League Young Player award was won by  Seol Young-woo (Ulsan Hyundai).

K League Top Scorer

The K League Top Scorer award was won by  Joo Min-kyu (Jeju United).

K League Top Assistor

The K League Top Assistor award was won by  Kim Bo-kyung (Jeonbuk Hyundai Motors).

K League Best XI

K League Manager of the Year
The K League Manager of the Year award was won by  Kim Sang-sik (Jeonbuk Hyundai Motors).

Controversies 
On December 12, 2021, Gangwon FC and Daejeon Hana Citizen faced one another in the second leg of the Promotion-relegation play-offs, with the latter team finding himself in advantage after winning the first leg 1–0. Played at Gangneung Stadium, Gangwon's home soil, the match saw the hosts secure a 4–1 comeback victory and maintain their spot in K League 1. However, the game was marred by a series of incidents, occurring between the first and the second half. After Han Kook-young had scored Gangwon's third goal in the 31st minute, the ball boys around the stadium reportedly started to delay giving the ball back to Daejeon players, an event that happened multiple times during the match and was possibly meant to waste time in favour of the hosts: the fans in the away sector reacted furiously, with some of them throwing plastic bottles in direction of one of the ball boys. The game still went ahead, as six minutes of extra time were added at the end of the second half. The K League administration decided to open an official investigation on the controversial events.

When asked to talk about the incidents, Gangwon's director Lee Young-pyo originally dismissed them, pointing out that similar instances were already common in European football, but later apologized, saying that he felt "direct responsibility" for the "unsmooth match" and promising that he would work so that Gangwon FC would become "a mature club" in the future. Meanwhile, on December 21, just hours before K League's final disciplinary meeting took place, the Daejeon board released an official response to the matter, stating that there was "clear evidence of the game delays being intentional and organized", as well as noticing that such acts violated the league's Code of Ethics for fair play and respect.

In the end, the league's administration decided to keep the final score unchanged: however, Gangwon FC was fined 30 million South Korean Won (US$25,000) for the episodes of time wasting, whereas Daejeon Hana Citizen was fined 2 million South Korean Won (US$1,677) for their fans' behavior towards one of the ball boys.

See also
 2021 K League 2

References

K League 1 seasons
South Korea
2021 in South Korean football
K League